Parlov is a Slavic surname. Notable people with the surname include:

Goran Parlov (born 1967), Croatian comic book artist
Ivan Parlov (born 1984), Croatian football midfielder
Mate Parlov (1948–2008), Croatian boxer 
Mate Parlov Sport Centre

See also 
Parlow

Surnames of Slavic origin